Ortho-carborane is the organoboron compound with the formula C2B10H12.  The prefix ortho is derived from ortho. It is the most prominent carborane. This derivative has been considered for a wide range of applications from heat-resistant polymers to medical applications. It is a colorless solid that melts, without decomposition, at 320 °C.

Structure
The cluster has C2v symmetry.

Preparation
Ortho-carborane is prepared by the addition of acetylenes to decaborane(14). Modern syntheses involve two stages, the first involving generation of an adduct of decaborane:
B10H14 + 2 SEt2  →  B10H12(SEt2)2 + H2
In the second stage, the alkyne is installed as the source of two carbon vertices:
B10H12(SEt2)2 + C2H2  →  C2B10H12 +  2 SEt2 + H2

Substituted acetylenes can be employed more conveniently than acetylene gas. For example bis(acetoxymethyl)acetylene adds to the decarborane readily.
B10H12(SEt2)2 + C2(CH2O2CCH3)2  →  C2B10H10(CH2O2CCH3)2 +  2 SEt2 + H2
The organic substituents are removed by ester hydrolysis followed by oxidation:
3 C2B10H10(CH2O2CH3)2 + 10 KOH  +  + 8 KMnO4  →  3 C2B10H12 + 6 CH3CO2K +  8 MnO2 +  6 K2CO3 + 8 H2O

Reactions

Thermal rearrangement
Upon heating to 420 °C, it rearranges to form the meta isomer. The para isomer is produced by heating to temperatures above 600 °C.

Reduction and "reverse isomerization"
ortho-Carborane undergoes 2e- reduction when treated with a solution of lithium in ammonia.  The result is the nido cluster 7,9-[C2B10H12]2-. In the dianion, the carbon vertices are not adjacent.  The same cluster is produced by reduction of meta-carborane.  Oxidation of the resulting 7,9-[C2B10H12]2- gives ortho-carborane.

Deprotonation
Treatment with organolithium reagents gives the dilithio derivative.
C2B10H12  +  2 BuLi  →   Li2C2B10H10  +  2 BuH
This dilithiated compound reacts with a variety of electrophiles, e.g. chlorophosphines, chlorosilanes, and sulfur.

Base-degradation to dicarbollide

Base degradation of ortho carborane gives the anionic 11-vertex derivative, precursor to dicarbollide complexes:
C2B10H12  +  NaOEt  +  2 EtOH  →  Na+C2B9H12−  +  H2  +  B(OEt)3
Na+C2B9H12−  +  NaH  →  Na2C2B8H11  +  H2

Dicarbollides (C2B8H112-) function as ligands for transition metals and f-elements. The dianion forms sandwich compounds, bis(dicarbollides). Dicarbollides, being strong electron donors, stabilize higher oxidation states, e.g. Ni(IV).

Deprotonation of carborane
The CH vertices of closo-dicarbadodecaboranes undergo deprotonation upon treatment with organolithium reagents:
 C2B10H12  +  2 BuLi  →   Li2C2B10H10  +  2 BuH

These dilithiated compounds react with a variety of electrophiles, e.g. chlorophosphines, chlorosilanes, and sulfur.  Many of the same compounds can be produced by hydroboration of alkynes:
Li2C2B10H10  +  2 RX  →  R2C2B10H10  +  2LiX
L2B10H10  +  RC2R  →  R2C2B10H10  +  2L  (L = MeCN, etc.)

ortho-Carborane can be converted to highly reactive carborynes with the formula B10C2H10.

History
The preparation of closo-dicarbadodecaboranes was reported independently by groups at Olin Corporation and the Reaction Motors Division of Thiokol Chemical Corporation working under the U.S. Air Force  and published in 1963. These groups demonstrated the high stability in air of 1,2-closo-dodecaborane and related compounds, presented a general synthesis, described the transformation of substituents without destroying the carborane cluster, and demonstrated the ortho to meta isomerization.

See also 
 Heteroborane
 Organoboron chemistry
 Platonic hydrocarbon

References 

Organoboron compounds
Cluster chemistry